Fumilay Fonseca (born 24 May 1988) is a São Toméan race walker.

At the age of sixteen, she appeared at the 2004 Summer Olympics finishing at 52nd place with a time of 2:04.54 hours. She was also the flag bearer for her country at the opening ceremony.

The next year she placed 24th at the 2005 World Youth Championships.

References

External links

1988 births
Living people
Athletes (track and field) at the 2004 Summer Olympics
Olympic athletes of São Tomé and Príncipe
São Tomé and Príncipe racewalkers
Female racewalkers
São Tomé and Príncipe female athletes